Merren is a surname. Notable people with the surname include:

Craig Merren (born 1966), Caymanian cyclist
Perry Merren (born 1969), Caymanian cyclist
Tyler Merren (born 1984), American goalball player

See also
Mirren